Ballycroy ( meaning "town of the stacks", either hay or turf) is a village in County Mayo, Connacht, Ireland. The village was the location for the 1982 film The Ballroom of Romance. The actual ballroom used in the film still exists, albeit in a derelict condition, and is located at Doona Cross, to the west of the village. Ballycroy is home to one of Ireland's National Parks, Wild Nephin (Ballycroy) National Park.

References 

Towns and villages in County Mayo